Tegostoma kenrickalis is a moth in the family Crambidae. It was described by Hubert Marion and Pierre Viette in 1956. It is found on Madagascar.

References

Odontiini
Moths described in 1956
Moths of Madagascar
Taxa named by Pierre Viette